George Robert Conzemius (July 23, 1936 – October 26, 2017) was an American politician, educator, farmer, and writer.

Conzemius was born in Hastings, Minnesota and graduated from Hastings High School in 1954. He served in the United States Army. Conzemius received his bachelor's degree from University of Minnesota in 1959. He taught science at Cannon Falls High School in Cannon Falls, Minnesota. Conzemius served on the Cannon Falls City Council in 1965 and 1966 and was a Democrat. Conzemius served in the Minnesota Senate from 1967 to 1977. Conzemius died in Cannon Falls, Minnesota.

Notes

1936 births
2017 deaths
People from Hastings, Minnesota
People from Goodhue County, Minnesota
Military personnel from Minnesota
University of Minnesota alumni
Educators from Minnesota
Minnesota city council members
Democratic Party Minnesota state senators